Grachyov or Grachev may refer to
Grachyov (surname)
Grachev (crater)
Grachev (rural locality), several rural localities in Russia